Khavazhi Khatsigov (born 17 April 1977 in Grozny) is a boxer from Belarus.

He was born in Russia, but after his failure to join the Russian national team (Raimkul Malakhbekov was the No.1 Russian bantamweight in that time), he moved to Belarus in 1999.

Khatsigov won a gold medal at the 2002 European Amateur Boxing Championships in Perm, Russia.

He qualified for the 2004 Summer Olympics by ending up in second place at the 4th AIBA European 2004 Olympic Qualifying Tournament in Baku, Azerbaijan. In Athens, Greece he defeated Juan Manuel López (boxer) but lost in the second round of the Bantamweight (54 kg) division to Thailand's eventual runner-up Worapoj Petchkoom.

He also qualified for the 2008 Summer Olympics, but was edged out by Veaceslav Gojan in his first bout.

External links
 Yahoo! Sports

1977 births
Living people
Bantamweight boxers
Boxers at the 2004 Summer Olympics
Boxers at the 2008 Summer Olympics
Olympic boxers of Belarus
Sportspeople from Grozny
Chechen martial artists
Chechen people
Belarusian people of Chechen descent
Belarusian male boxers